"Inside Out" is single from New Zealand folk band Avalanche City. Released in 2015, the song reached number one in the Official New Zealand Music Chart and as of 20 September 2015 has charted for 13 weeks. The song is the only New Zealand song to make it to number one in 2015, in the New Zealand top 40 charts.

Music videos 
A preview music video was released on 27 April 2015. Directed by Dave Murray. The video won the 2015 Raglan Arts Film Festival Awards "Best Music Video Award".

A music video for the song was released on 30 July 2015. Directed by Chris Lane

Track listing 

Digital download
"Inside Out" – 4:37

Charts and certification

Weekly charts

Year-end charts

Certifications

References 

2015 songs
Avalanche City songs
Number-one singles in New Zealand
Warner Music Group singles